Too Much Sex is a 2000 Canadian sex comedy film directed by Andrew Ainsworth, produced by the Canadian Film Centre and starring Michael McMurtry, Janet Kidder (niece of Margot Kidder) and Diane Flacks. Sky Gilbert and Christie MacFadyen (who starred in The Top of His Head) also have minor appearances.

Plot
Allgood Butts is a young promiscuous male hairdresser whose goal in life is to sleep with as many women as possible (already in the first scenes we are told he has slept with 389 women). His guardian angel (played by Diane Flacks) does not approve of his philandering and confronts him while he has sex with his 390th woman, telling him that if he sleeps with another woman, he'll die. Allgood's struggle with his temptation becomes even more difficult when two attractive women enter his life.

External links
 
 Too Much Sex at the Canadian Film Centre website.
 Canada rejects Too Much Sex - Playback
 On set: FFP goes for S-E-X - Playback
 Summary from Allmovie

2000 films
2000s English-language films
2000 romantic comedy films
Canadian sex comedy films
Canadian Film Centre films
English-language Canadian films
2000s Canadian films